Events from the year 1821 in Canada.

Incumbents
Monarch: George IV

Federal government
Parliament of Lower Canada: 11th 
Parliament of Upper Canada: 8th

Governors
Governor of the Canadas: Robert Milnes
Governor of New Brunswick: George Stracey Smyth
Governor of Nova Scotia: John Coape Sherbrooke
Commodore-Governor of Newfoundland: Richard Goodwin Keats
Governor of Prince Edward Island: Charles Douglass Smith

Events
July 17 – Construction of the Lachine Canal in Montreal begins.
July – The Hudson's Bay Company merges with archrivals, the Montreal-based North West Company, creating unemployment for a substantial proportion of their Métis workforce. 
No foreigners allowed in Russian-American waters, except at regular ports of call.

Births
February 21 – John Beverley Robinson, politician (d.1896) 
March 12 – John Abbott, politician and 3rd Prime Minister of Canada (d.1893)

July 2 – Charles Tupper, politician, Premier of Nova Scotia and 6th Prime Minister of Canada (d.1915)
July 6 – Henri Bernier, politician, businessman and manufacturer (d.1893)
August 13 – Philip Carteret Hill, politician and Premier of Nova Scotia (d.1894)
August 18 – Maurice Laframboise, lawyer, judge and politician (d.1882)

Deaths

References 

 
Canada
Years of the 19th century in Canada
1821 in North America